Jiří Štajner (born 27 May 1976) is a Czech former professional footballer who played as an attacking midfielder or second striker. Eight years a player for Hannover 96, he is extremely popular with Hannover fans and is seen as a cult figure at the club.

Club career

Czech Republic
Štajner started his active footballing career in the youth teams of SK Dynamo České Budějovice. At a young age, he was picked up by one of the league's best teams, SK Slavia Prague. He failed to make a breakthrough at Slavia, continuing his youth career with TJ Senohraby, an amateur club close to the city where he grew up - Benešov.

In 1998, Štajner moved on to FK Baník Most in an attempt to advance his career, although his breakthrough was to come at the beginning of the new millennium after signing for Slovan Liberec, as he became known as an excellent goalscorer and attracted attention with his European performances in the UEFA Cup. In the 2001–02 season he was the Gambrinus liga's top goalscorer with 15 goals as Slovan secured the title. In the summer of 2002, Štajner was signed by German Bundesliga side  Hannover 96.

Hannover 96
Štajner quickly became a favourite with coach Ralf Rangnick, although the club from the Lower Saxonian capital had to pay his former club €3.5 million, which made Štajner the most expensive player in the history of Hannover 96.

At the beginning of his spell in Germany he had trouble adapting to the style of play, only becoming a regular starter in his second season. On 22 May 2003, Štajner helped cement his status as a cult hero for the club, notably scoring the decisive goal against Borussia Mönchengladbach to retain Hannover's place in the top flight. The match ended 2–2.

On 15 May 2010, he announced his return to his former club FC Slovan Liberec.

In 2015, he joined Czech lower league side TJ Spartak Chrastava.

International career
Štajner was a member of the Czech Republic national team, and played in the 2006 FIFA World Cup.

Honours
Slovan Liberec
Czech Cup: 1999–2000
Gambrinus liga: 2001–02

References

External links
 
 
 

1976 births
Living people
People from Benešov
Association football forwards
Association football midfielders
Czech footballers
Czech expatriate footballers
Czech Republic international footballers
Czech First League players
Bundesliga players
2006 FIFA World Cup players
Hannover 96 players
SK Slavia Prague players
FC Slovan Liberec players
AC Sparta Prague players
FK Baník Most players
FK Mladá Boleslav players
FC Oberlausitz Neugersdorf players
Expatriate footballers in Germany
Czech expatriate sportspeople in Germany
Sportspeople from the Central Bohemian Region